The 2008–09 season was the 123rd season in the history of Luton Town Football Club. The team's 24th-place finish in League One in 2007–08 meant the club competed in League Two. The club was docked 30 points at the start of the season; 10 by The Football Association for irregular matters involving player transfers, and 20 by the Football League for breaking rules on exiting administration. As a result, the club finished bottom of the league and was relegated to the Conference Premier. The season was not, however, without success – Luton beat Scunthorpe United 3–2 at Wembley to win the Football League Trophy for the first time.

This article covers the period from 1 July 2008 to 30 June 2009.

Background

Kevin Blackwell's Luton team had a woeful 2007–08 season, due in no small part to the chaos behind the scenes at the club. Chairman David Pinkney, who had only months before taken over the club promising success, took the club into administration on 22 November 2007, stating he would fund the club's overheads. The club had ten points deducted as punishment. Meanwhile, an FA probe on transfer irregularities dragged on, described by Pinkney as "a storm in a teacup".

On 12 January, Kevin Blackwell and his assistants Sam Ellis and John Carver announced their intention to resign from the club on 9 February. This came after the administrator had sold captain Chris Coyne to Colchester United and midfielder David Edwards to Wolverhampton Wanderers for £350,000 and £675,000 respectively. Blackwell had managed to guide his team to an FA Cup replay against Liverpool at Anfield, which assisted financially, but failed to prevent further sales. On the same day as the replay at Anfield, 15 January, the administrator awarded "preferred bidder" status to Luton Town Football Club 2020, a consortium fronted by broadcaster and Luton Town supporter Nick Owen. 2020 loaned money to the club to keep them operating and, in return, were granted exclusive negotiation rights until the end of February 2008. Blackwell and his assistants were all sacked by the administrator on the same day, following a 5–0 defeat to Liverpool, to be replaced by former player Mick Harford, with Warren Neill installed as his assistant. On 26 February, the 2020 consortium had their bid for the club conditionally accepted by the administrator. This meant that they were now custodians of the club until the end of the season, and that the Football League would have to negotiate terms to return the Golden Share to Luton Town for the 2008–09 campaign.

Luton were relegated to League Two following a 2–1 home defeat to Brighton & Hove Albion on 12 April. The defeat left the Hatters rooted to the bottom of the table on 33 points, three points behind fellow strugglers Port Vale, who were also relegated on the same day. Luton lost all of their remaining league games and finished the season in bottom place and 17 points adrift of safety.

On 3 June, the FA's probe finally finished, and Luton were found guilty of 15 misconduct charges. The club was handed a ten-point deduction for the 2008–09 campaign, and a £50,000 fine. However, the situation soon went from bad to worse as, since the club had violated Football League rules by leaving administration without having made a Company Voluntary Arrangement with its creditors, the Football League only offered to return the Golden Share (that would allow the club to compete) to Luton on the condition that they play with a further twenty-point deduction. Luton appealed against the decision, but their appeal was thrown out. As a result, Luton Town began the 2008–09 season with an unprecedented −30 points, and facing a mighty fight merely to avoid relegation from the Football League for the first time in their history.

Review

Pre-season
Following the player sales in the previous season, Luton manager Mick Harford needed to practically rebuild his squad from scratch. A Football League-enforced transfer embargo that was in place until 48 hours before their first game of the season handicapped Harford further. Once the embargo was lifted on 8 August, the club signed nine players: former player Kevin Nicholls returned from a spell at Preston North End to captain the team; Claude Gnakpa joined from Peterborough United; Asa Hall signed from Birmingham City; George Pilkington arrived from Port Vale, and many others were signed including Michael Spillane and Chris Martin, both on season-long loans from Norwich City.

August and September
Luton made an indifferent start to the season, beating Plymouth Argyle in the League Cup, before going down 5–1 in the next round at Reading. By the end of September, Luton had reached −19 points in the league. This included an opening day home defeat to Port Vale, but narrow away victories over both Gillingham and Exeter City.

October
Luton's form soon slumped – after a draw away at Bradford City and a penalty shootout win over Brentford in the Football League Trophy, they lost two home games in a row. First Darlington inflicted defeat with a last minute winner in front of the Oak Road, then Luton were beaten 2–1 at home by Accrington Stanley in the first ever meeting between the two clubs.

Meanwhile, manager Mick Harford continued to try to regenerate the squad – Irish winger Garreth O'Connor was drafted in from free agency, as was former Coventry City forward Wayne Andrews. A spate of injuries did not help matters – talismanic captain Nicholls had not played since August, forward Sam Parkin was struggling with a recurring ankle injury, and defender Pilkington was out after becoming injured in early September. Harford introduced several younger players into the squad, including 16-year-old left-back Jake Howells from the youth team, 19-year-old Harry Worley on loan from Leicester City and 20-year-old striker Tom Craddock on loan from Middlesbrough.

Craddock made a big impact in his second game – scoring two goals in a 2–2 draw at Grimsby Town. Craddock earned and scored a penalty after Grimsby had taken an early lead, and then, deep into injury time, crashed the ball into the far corner from long range to secure a vital point for Luton. Luton Town history was made in this game as striker Jordan Patrick pulled on the number 29 shirt to become the club's youngest ever player – at 16 years and 7 days, Patrick came off the bench to set up Craddock's equaliser. Craddock scored again in a 2–1 win against Bury to quickly establish himself in the team. Parkin, one of the club's highest earners, returned from injury during this game, but failed to score. He was sent out on loan to Leyton Orient days later, with a view to a permanent deal. Three days later, a Tuesday night game against AFC Bournemouth at Kenilworth Road was abandoned after only eight minutes due to bad weather.

November
Luton's form was interrupted – a 3–0 annihilation followed that Saturday at Shrewsbury Town, putting a dent into Luton's charge for safety. A win in the Football League Trophy, against League One club Walsall, was the exception rather than the rule. Ahead of the next game, at home against Dagenham & Redbridge, Luton were boosted by the news that Craddock had extended his loan from Middlesbrough by a month. However, when Craddock injured his groin only days later, Luton were forced to bring in another striker – former Queens Park Rangers player Kevin Gallen was signed on loan for a month from MK Dons. Results did not improve, with consecutive losses to Rochdale and Brentford. An exit from the FA Cup followed, as Southend comfortably beat Luton 3–1 at Roots Hall.

December
December saw a revival in fortunes, as the Hatters went the entire month unbeaten. After a thrilling 3–3 draw at Kenilworth Road in the rescheduled game against Bournemouth, Luton beat Barnet 3–1. A 0–0 draw at top-of-the-table Wycombe Wanderers followed a week later, before Luton beat Colchester United in the Football League Trophy to earn a place in the Southern Area Final against Brighton & Hove Albion.

Craddock extended his loan from Middlesbrough by another month soon after. Luton's unbeaten run continued on Boxing Day; Ian Roper's goal six minutes into injury time sealing a point at Chesterfield. Two days later came a home win against Lincoln City, Roper scoring again after Martin had put Luton 2–0 ahead – the match finished 3–2. Luton were now only one point away from cancelling out their 30-point deduction.

January
Winger Ian Henderson, available as a free agent, signed on New Year's Day and Gallen's loan was also extended. To make room on the wage bill, O'Connor and Kevin Watson both left after short careers as Luton players. The club then had a bad run of results, including a 5–1 defeat at Darlington. Before the Darlington game, Luton signed Colchester United forward Akanni-Sunday Wasiu on loan for a month, while extending goalkeeper Conrad Logan's stay for a further month and signing Gallen on a permanent deal. Andrews was released soon after.

In the first leg of the Football League Trophy Southern Area Final on 20 January, Luton travelled to Brighton & Hove Albion and battled to a 0–0 draw, giving them a slight advantage for the second leg at Kenilworth Road. A controversial 3–3 draw with Bradford City saw both teams' managers, Mick Harford and Stuart McCall, and Luton captain Nicholls all set dates for FA hearings following a bizarre refereeing performance from Trevor Kettle.

Craddock signed an £80,000 permanent deal on 27 January, with Drew Talbot leaving for Chesterfield on loan to make room on the wage budget. Luton's poor run of league form continued.

February
A series of postponements due to adverse weather meant the club did not play for another two weeks and, when they did, they lost 2–1 to Dagenham & Redbridge.

17 February saw Brighton & Hove Albion return for the second leg of the Football League Trophy Southern Area Final. Luton took the lead after 59 seconds through Craddock, following a defensive mix-up. Brighton equalised with a Nicky Forster goal before David Livermore was sent off for a dangerous tackle on Spillane. Neither club made a breakthrough in the remainder of the match, which went to a penalty shoot-out. Luton's on-loan goalkeeper from Derby County, Lewis Price, saved from Jason Jarrett and Chris Birchall to take Luton into the final against Scunthorpe United on 5 April at Wembley Stadium. This appeared to have given Luton something of a confidence boost as they then went four games unbeaten in the league. Craddock scored again against Shrewsbury Town as Luton won 3–1, and carried on his scoring form over the next month.

March
The next major game was on 17 March against relegation rivals Grimsby Town. Grimsby boss Mike Newell, formerly manager of Luton Town, was suing the club for unfair dismissal. Newell received an angry reception, which turned to jeers when Hall scored a last minute winner to give Luton the three points.

Macclesfield Town then visited Kenilworth Road, and a Craddock penalty was enough to secure a 1–0 victory for Luton – the first time the club had secured two straight wins all season. Meanwhile, the club announced they had sold out their allocated 30,000 tickets for the Football League Trophy final almost immediately, and were given another 8,500 which went just as fast – setting a record for the most fans at Wembley Stadium from one club. However, Luton were told they would not be given any more due to "segregation issues". As a result, the final saw 40,000 Wembley seats empty.

26 March, loan deadline day, saw Luton bring in experienced midfielder David Livermore from Brighton & Hove Albion on a month's loan. Meanwhile, young striker Ryan Charles moved to Kettering Town on loan, also for a month. Two days later the Hatters travelled to Morecambe, unbeaten in twelve games. Goals from Martin and Gallen saw Luton beat Morecambe 2–1 and, in doing so, managed three straight wins for the first time since the 2004–05 League One winning season. Luton were now only eight points behind Chester City and with a game in hand. The match that Tuesday against Rotherham United, Luton's game in hand, could not have been more vital, but the Hatters ended up being defeated 4–2 and suffered a severe blow to their hopes of escaping relegation.

The FA hearings from the Bradford City game in January rolled around for Nicholls, Mick Harford and the club on 23 March – Harford was fined a total of £1,000, the club £2,000, and Nicholls £1,000. Nicholls was also handed a five-match ban to begin on 7 April – however, the club lodged an appeal against the ban on 31 March, delaying its effect until after the appeal was heard.

April
April began with the news that the club had won their case against former manager Mike Newell. Newell claimed that in his contract he had been entitled to 10% of any profit on players sold. However, his claim for £400,000 in unpaid transfer money was not upheld by a Football League panel on 31 March.

5 April finally came, and Luton faced Scunthorpe United at Wembley Stadium in the Football League Trophy final as 40,000 Luton supporters converged on Wembley, dwarfing Scunthorpe's support of 13,000. Brian Mawhinney, Chairman of the Football League, was roundly booed by the Luton support before the game, in protest at the huge point deductions imposed at the start of the season. When the game got going, however, it was Scunthorpe who drew first blood in a pulsating match. Gary Hooper put Scunthorpe ahead early on with a low shot past Dean Brill. Craddock set up Martin with a superb cross a few minutes later, and Martin chested the ball down to shoot into the far corner to make it 1–1. In the second half, Craddock scored a half-volley from the edge of the box to make it 2–1, but Grant McCann forced extra time with a spectacular strike with only minutes left. Craddock was substituted and replaced by French defender Gnakpa, played in an unusually forward role by Mick Harford – it was a gamble which paid off, as Gnakpa ran onto a long ball from Keith Keane and got a touch that carried the ball over Joe Murphy and into the net, sending the supporters wild. Luton clung on, with man-of-the-match captain Nicholls at the centre of the game, and held on to win the match 3–2 and bring the Football League Trophy to Luton for the first time.

Only eight days later, Luton lost their League status – Lincoln City dealt another blow, as Luton were held to a 0–0 draw, and the final nail in the coffin came two days later as, on 13 April 2009, Luton Town were finally relegated from The Football League after a spell of 89 years. Chesterfield held Luton to a draw and, coupled with former Luton manager Mike Newell's Grimsby Town side winning, this meant the club's survival in the league became mathematically impossible to achieve.

Relegation opened the question of whether Luton would be allowed to enter the Football League Trophy during the 2009–10 season. Luton soon submitted an application to the Football League, asking for special dispensation to defend their title.

A Rossi Jarvis goal saved a point at Barnet on 18 April. Nicholls was sent off late on for collecting two yellow cards, and Brill saved a penalty from former Hatter Paul Furlong. Wycombe Wanderers then came to Kenilworth Road, but despite Luton forcing pressure on the promotion contenders, Wycombe managed a goal on the break following an error by Sol Davis and Luton failed to find an equaliser. Luton's last home game in the Football League was a 1–1 draw with promotion chasers Rochdale, with Craddock scoring a penalty before Adam Rundle rescued a point for the visitors.

27 April saw the appeal against the Nicholls ban heard at the FA, and the decision was upheld, meaning that Nicholls would miss the match against Brentford on 2 May, as well as the first four games of the 2009–10 season. Two days later, long-serving club secretary Cherry Newbury, an employee since 1978, finally left by mutual consent after a period of suspension on full pay starting in January. Newbury had been secretary since 1994, and was implicated as the employee who drew The Football Association's attention to former directors paying agents through the club's holding company.

May and June
Luton Town bowed out of the Football League after 89 years with a 2–0 defeat at champions Brentford.

The first signing of the summer for Luton's time in non-League football was announced on 26 May, as lifelong Luton Town supporter Andy Burgess signed a two-year contract, joining from Rushden & Diamonds on a free transfer. The next day saw five players released – Parkin, Dean Morgan, Paul McVeigh, Davis and Brill all left as their contracts had ended. Adam Newton signed a two-year contract on 28 May following his release from Brentford, as regeneration of the squad continued. Gallen signed a new one-year deal the same day. Young defender Howells signed his first professional deal on 2 June. Three days later, Liam Hatch arrived on loan from Peterborough United for the 2009–10 season. Central defender Alan White rejoined Luton on 8 June, nine years after leaving in 2000.

On 15 June, the request to defend the Football League Trophy title was turned down. Experienced goalkeeper Mark Tyler signed a two-year deal two years later.

Match results

Luton Town results given first.

Legend

Friendlies

Football League Two

FA Cup

Football League Cup

Football League Trophy

League table

Player statistics
Last match played on 2 May 2009. Players with a zero in every column only appeared as unused substitutes.

Managerial statistics
Only competitive games from the 2008–09 season are included.
Correct as of 13 November 2009.

Awards
''Awarded on 26 April 2009, except Loyal Luton award awarded on 24 April 2009.

Transfers

In

Out

Loans in

Loans out

See also
List of Luton Town F.C. seasons

Footnotes

A.  Luton won 4–3 in a penalty shootout.
B.  Luton won 4–2 in a penalty shootout.
C.  Luton Town won the match 3–2 after extra time, after the score was 2–2 after 90 minutes.
D.  The goal of the season was chosen to be Chris Martin's goal on 5 April against Scunthorpe United at Wembley Stadium in the Football League Trophy final.

References

Luton Town F.C. seasons
Luton Town